Stephen John Glasson OAM (born 10 April 1969) is an Australian bowls player. He was number one in the world in 2004 and was ranked first in Australia between 1997 and 2005. He is currently the Australian national bowls coach.

Early life
Glasson was born in Sydney, New South Wales in 1969. His father, Bob Glasson was a former Queensland bowls representative. Glasson took up bowls as a young child in the mid-1970s.

While working as a bank teller as a teenager, his bank was held up. He decided to change jobs, becoming an apprentice greenkeeper at a bowls club.

Playing career

World Championships
In 2004 Glasson became world singles champion when he won a gold medal at the 2004 World Outdoor Bowls Championship in Scotland, becoming the first Australian to be world number one in men's singles.

Asia Pacific Championships
He won eight medals at the Asia Pacific Bowls Championships including two gold medals.

National
Glasson won the Australian National Indoor championship nine times (1994, 1997–1999, 2001–2005). He was the number one ranked player in Australia between 1997 and 2005.

Commonwealth Games
Glasson competed in the singles at the 1998 Commonwealth Games and 2002 Commonwealth Games. He was omitted from the Australian team for the 2006 Commonwealth Games after a dispute over fitness requirements set down by Bowls Australia. Bowls Australia claimed that poor form had also been a contributory factor.

Coaching career
In 2011 he replaced Rex Johnston as Bowls Australia national coach. In 2012, he only played occasionally to focus on his off-field role as a coach.

Honours
In 2000 Glasson was awarded the Australian Sports Medal for his playing and coaching achievements. He was inducted into the Bowls Australia Hall of Fame in 2011. He was further honoured in 2012, awarded the Medal of the Order of Australia (OAM).

Other major bowling achievements
4xNSW Premier League Titles With St Johns Park Bowling Club
Mazda Jack High Winner-1997
World Indoor Pairs Semi-Finalist-Twice 1998&2000
South African Masters Runner Up-1999

References

External links
 Glasson at Bowls Australia

1969 births
Australian male bowls players
Living people
Sportsmen from Queensland
Sportspeople from Brisbane
Bowls World Champions
20th-century Australian people